Vakhtapur is a village and former Rajput non-salute princely state in Gujarat, western India.

History 
The minor princely state, belonging to the Pandu Mehwas division of Rewa Kantha, was ruled by Rajput Chieftains. 

In 1901 it comprised only the single village, covering 1 1/2 square miles, with a population of 244, yielding 816 Rupees state revenue (1903-4, mostly from land), paying 116 Rupees tribute, to the Gaekwar Baroda State.

References

External links and Sources 
 Imperial Gazetteer, on DSAL.UChicago.edu - Rewa Kantha

Princely states of Gujarat
Rajput princely states